Benjamin Shurendy Martha (born 28 November 1981) is a former professional footballer who plays as a forward. At international level, he has played for the Netherlands Antilles and Curaçao national teams.

Club career 
Martha was born in Willemstad, Curaçao, in the former Netherlands Antilles. He began his football career 1989 in the youth team of NAC Breda and signed in summer 2002 for vv Rijsoord in Ridderkerk. He played for PVV DOTO in amateur level and signed a two-year contract with RBC Roosendaal in summer 2006. After two years who earned 71 gamed scored 20 goals left the club 2008 to sign for Quick Boys. On 24 March 2010, he left Quick Boys to sign for League rival RVVH.

International career
Martha played for the Netherlands Antilles national team earning his first cap on 6 February 2008 against Nicaragua.

Personal life 
He is the brother from Eugene Martha, who played also with him on national team side.

References

External links

1981 births
Living people
People from Willemstad
Curaçao footballers
Dutch Antillean footballers
Association football forwards
Dual internationalists (football)
Curaçao international footballers
Netherlands Antilles international footballers
Eerste Divisie players
Derde Divisie players
Sekshon Pagá players
RBC Roosendaal players
Kozakken Boys players
SV Hubentut Fortuna players
RVVH players
Expatriate footballers in the Netherlands